Lucanus swinhoei is a herbivorous beetle of the family Lucanidae. It is endemic to Taiwan. It is a squat, heavyset beetle that ranges from around 35 to 55 mm in length, and can be easily identified due to the small "teeth" that line its mandibles.

References

swinhoei
Beetles described in 1874
Insects of Taiwan
Endemic fauna of Taiwan